Guyanagaster is a genus of fungi in the family Physalacriaceae. The genus contains two wood-decaying sequestrate species Guyanagaster necrorhizus and Guyanagaster lucianii. The species, found in the neotropical rainforests of the Guiana Shield, was first described scientifically in 2010.

References

External links
 

Physalacriaceae
Fungi of South America
Monotypic Basidiomycota genera
Taxa described in 2010